Montpelier Stable may refer to two different Thoroughbred horse racing stables:
 Montpelier Stable of Richard Thornton Wilson, Jr. (1866–1929)
 Montpelier Stable of Marion duPont Scott (1894–1983)